Enrico "Rico" Simen (born 12 January 1962) is a former Swiss curler.

He played  third on the Swiss rink that won a silver medal at the 1988 Winter Olympics when curling was a demonstration sport. He was also a silver medallist at the 1994 European Curling Championships, and is a silver (1994) and bronze (1997) medallist at the Swiss Men's Curling Championship, and a two-time Swiss junior champion curler (1980, 1981).

Teams

References

External links

 Soudog's Curling History Site: Curling at the Olympics - 1988

Living people
1962 births
Swiss male curlers
Curlers at the 1988 Winter Olympics
Olympic curlers of Switzerland
Place of birth missing (living people)
20th-century Swiss people